The Museum of the Macedonian Struggle is a national museum of North Macedonia located in the capital city of Skopje. Construction of the museum began on 11 June 2008 and it was opened to the public on the 20th anniversary of the declaration of independence on 8 September 2011. The building is located between the Museum of Archaeology, the Holocaust Museum of Macedonia, the Stone Bridge and the Vardar River.

The exhibit covers the period from the beginning of the resistance movement against the Ottoman rule, until the declaration of independence from Yugoslavia on 8 September 1991. The guided tours take visitors through 13 exhibits ending in front of the original copy of the 1991 Declaration of Independence.

External links
 Official Website of the Museum for the Macedonian Struggle

Museum of the Macedonian Struggle
Museums in North Macedonia
Museums established in 2011
Museum of the Macedonian Struggle (Skopje)